Luigi Pavese (25 October 1897 – 13 December 1969) was an Italian actor and voice actor.

Biography
Born in Asti, Pavese started his career in 1916 working as a silent film actor at 19 years of age. He then began his theatrical debut in 1921 and eventually worked his way up to becoming a film actor by the 1930s. He appeared in more than 170 films between 1916 and 1969. By the time World War II ended, Pavese's popularity as an actor increased. He often portrayed characters with certain professions such as clerks, lawyers, soldiers, officers and notaries in comedy films and made frequent collaborations with other actors such as Totò, Aldo Fabrizi, Walter Chiari, Alberto Sordi, including his younger brother Nino Pavese.

As a voice actor, Pavese dubbed the voices of characters into the Italian language. He was the official voice actor of Fernando Sancho, Robert Strauss and many more. He even provided the Italian voices of animated characters belonging to The Walt Disney Company, most notably Colonel Hathi in The Jungle Book as well as Boris in Lady and the Tramp and a Labrador in One Hundred and One Dalmatians.

Pavese died in Rome of a heart attack in the morning of 13 December 1969 at the age of 72.

Selected filmography

 The Sinful Woman (1916)
 Aldebaran (1935)
 The Joker King (1935)
 Golden Arrow (1935)
 Joe the Red (1936)
 La Damigella di Bard (1936)
 Doctor Antonio (1937)
 At Your Orders, Madame (1939)
 Eternal Melodies (1940)
 The Hussar Captain (1940)
 Antonio Meucci (1940)
 The Secret Lover (1941)
 The Happy Ghost (1941)
 A Woman Has Fallen (1941)
 Pirates of Malaya (1941)
 The Two Tigers (1941)
 The Two Orphans (1942)
 Malombra (1942)
 Knights of the Desert (1942)
 Harlem (1943)
 Special Correspondents (1943)
 La Fornarina (1944)
 The Priest's Hat (1944)
 His Young Wife (1945)
 The Ten Commandments (1945)
 Black Eagle (1946)
 Crime News (1947)
 Lost in the Dark (1947)
 Heart (1948)
 Guarany (1948)
 Les Misérables (1948)
 Fear and Sand (1948)
 Toto Looks for a House (1949) 
 Totò Le Mokò (1949)
 Anthony of Padua (1949)
 Barrier to the North (1950)
 The Merry Widower (1950)
 Figaro Here, Figaro There (1950)
The Elusive Twelve (1950)
 Tragic Serenade (1951)
 I'm the Capataz (1951)
 Beauties on Bicycles (1951)
 Free Escape (1951)
 Mamma Mia, What an Impression! (1951)
 The Passaguai Family (1951)
 I, Hamlet (1952)
 Lieutenant Giorgio (1952)
 Toto in Color (1952) 
 The Passaguai Family Gets Rich (1952)
 The Dream of Zorro (1952)
 Lulu (1953)
 Via Padova 46 (1953)
 Farewell, My Beautiful Lady (1954)
 Tripoli, Beautiful Land of Love (1954)
 The Lovers of Manon Lescaut (1954)
 Legs of Gold (1958)
 The Italians They Are Crazy (1958)
 Ciao, ciao bambina! (1959)
 Gentlemen Are Born (1960)
 Il Mattatore (1960)
 Tough Guys (1960)
 Who Hesitates is Lost (1960)
 Toto, Fabrizi and the Young People Today (1960)
 Toto Diabolicus (1962)
 West and Soda (1965) (voice)
 For a Few Dollars Less (1966)
 May God Forgive You... But I Won't (1968)

Dubbing roles

Animation
Colonel Hathi in The Jungle Book
Clown #2 in Dumbo
King Gruesome in Alakazam the Great
Boris in Lady and the Tramp
Labrador in One Hundred and One Dalmatians
Barbarossa in Asterix and Cleopatra
Eeyore in Winnie the Pooh and the Blustery Day
Eeyore in Winnie the Pooh and the Honey Tree

Live action
God in The Ten Commandments
The Cowardly Lion / "Zeke" in The Wizard of Oz
Carrancho in Man from Canyon City
Luther Ackenthorpe in Murder, She Said
Sergeant McClusky in Jumping Jacks
Mr. Kruhulik in The Seven Year Itch
Stanislas "Animal" Kuzawa in Stalag 17
Nick in It's a Wonderful Life
Zero Schwiefka in The Man with the Golden Arm
Balthazar in Ben-Hur
Miguel in Seven Guns for the MacGregors
M in Goldfinger
Sam Carraclough in Lassie Come Home
John P. Clum in Gunfight at the O.K. Corral
Zebulon Prescott in How the West Was Won
Colonel Manfred von Holstein in Those Magnificent Men in their Flying Machines
Whitey Krause in The Helen Morgan Story
Culpepper in In Harm's Way
Silas Meacham in Fort Apache
Jake in Curtain Call at Cactus Creek
J.P. Norton in Air Raid Wardens
Grumpy in The Errand Boy
Harvey "Big Daddy" Pollitt in Cat on a Hot Tin Roof
Big Han in Blood Alley

References

External links

 
 
 
 

1897 births
1969 deaths
People from Asti
Italian male film actors
Italian male silent film actors
Italian male voice actors
Italian male stage actors
Italian male television actors
20th-century Italian male actors